Raja Ashfaq Sarwar (27 October 1954 — 11 April 2020) was a Pakistani politician, Member of Punjab Assembly, former Adviser to Chief Minister of Punjab, and Minister for Labour and Human Resource. He was Secretary General of the center-right party PMLN in Punjab. He had held various portfolios over his career including Minister for Youth Affairs, Minister for Forestry Wildlife & Fisheries, and Minister for Health.

Early life and education
Raja Ashfaq Sarwar, born at Holy Family Hospital in Rawalpindi, hails from the village of Ghora Gali in the Murree Hills and is the eldest son of Raja Ghulam Sarwar (late) a two-time member of West Pakistan Assembly. He attended Lawrence College.

Political career
His political career started in 1988 when he successfully contested for a Punjab Assembly seat from Murree as an Independent candidate. He joined PML (a part of IJI then) later becoming PMLN, and was appointed Provincial Labour Minister.

He successfully contested for the same seat in 1990 and became the Punjab Minister for Forestry, Wildlife, Fisheries and Minister of Youth Affairs. Within the party he became President of PML Youth Wing Punjab where he appointed Khawaja Saad Rafique as general secretary. He was re-elected as an MPA in 1993 and 1997 where he became Provincial Minister for Health and Population Welfare up until the 1999 coup d'état by General Pervez Musharraf.

Following the Military Coup he took a break from his own elections to focus on strengthening PML N, and restoring Democracy and the Judiciary in Pakistan. During this period he was twice-elected as General Secretary of PMLN in Punjab and currently holds this position. In 2008 he was appointed as Adviser to Chief Minister of Punjab Shahbaz Sharif.

On 11 May 2013 he was again elected as Member of Punjab Assembly from his home constituency of PP-1 in Rawalpindi District, serving Tehsil Murree and Tehsil Kotli Sattian, maintaining his 100% electoral record.

He died on 11 April 2020 at the age of 65 after a prolonged illness.

Election history

References

External links
 Profile of Raja Ashfaq Sarwar
 Political History of Murree
 Official PML-N Website

1954 births
Living people
Pakistan Muslim League (N) MPAs (Punjab)
People from Murree
Lawrence College Ghora Gali alumni
Ross School of Business alumni
Punjab MPAs 2013–2018